Hānai is a term used in the Hawaiian culture that refers to the informal adoption of one person by another. It can be used as an adjective, such as "hānai child", or as a verb to hānai someone into the family.

In the Hawaiian culture, hānai has historically been a practice of one family hānai-ing their child into another family. It has made tracing genealogical roots somewhat more complicated.

When Winona Beamer spoke about the issue of hānai and its relevance to admission at Kamehameha Schools, she had first-hand knowledge of the practice in her immediate family. Kaliko Beamer-Trapp was born in England, but emigrated to the United States with his biological mother. When Beamer decided to hānai Kaliko into her family, it was with a special hānai ceremony.

Other Polynesian cultures, such as the Tahitians and Māori (in which culture the phenomenon is known as whāngai), have similar practices of adoptions.

See also
:Category:Hawaiian adoptees (hānai)

References

External links

Hawaiian words and phrases
Hawaii culture
Hawaiiana
Adoption in the United States